The 2013 Women's European Volleyball Championship was the 28th edition of the European Volleyball Championship, organised by Europe's governing volleyball body, the Confédération Européenne de Volleyball. It was hosted by Germany and Switzerland from 6 to 14 September 2013. The matches took place in 5 different cities (4 in Germany and one in Switzerland) with the final being played in Berlin.

Russia defeated Germany 3–1 in the final to capture their 18th title and the qualification for the 2013 FIVB Women's World Grand Champions Cup.

Qualification

Format
The tournament was played in two different stages. In the first stage, the sixteen participants were divided in four groups of four teams each. A single round-robin format was played within each group to determine the teams group position, the three best teams of each group (total of 12 teams) progressed to the second stage, with group winners advancing to the quarterfinals while second and third placed advancing to the playoffs.

The second stage of the tournament consisted of a single-elimination, with winners advancing to the next round. A playoff was played (involving group second and third places) to determine which teams joined the group winners in the quarterfinals, followed by semifinals, 3rd place match and final.

Pools composition

Squads

Venues
The tournament took place in Germany in 4 different venues (Halle, Dresden, Schwerin, Berlin) and one in Switzerland – (Zürich). The semifinals and the finals were played in Berlin, Germany.

Preliminary round
The draw was held on 6 October 2012 at Zürich, Switzerland.

 All times are Central European Summer Time (UTC+02:00).

Pool A
venue: Gerry Weber Stadion, Halle, Germany

|}

|}

Pool B
venue: Hallenstadion, Zürich, Switzerland

|}

|}

Pool C
venue: EnergieVerbund Arena, Dresden, Germany

|}

|}

Pool D
venue: Sport- und Kongresshalle, Schwerin, Germany

|}

|}

Championship round
venues:
Gerry Weber Stadion, Halle, Germany
Hallenstadion, Zürich, Switzerland
Max-Schmeling-Halle, Berlin, Germany
 All times are Central European Summer Time (UTC+02:00).

Playoffs

|}

Quarterfinals

|}

Semifinals

|}

Bronze medal match

|}

Final

|}

Final standing

3	Daria Isaeva	
4	Irina Zaryazhko	
5	Aleksandra Pasynkova	
6	Anna Matienko	
7	Svetlana Kryuchkova (L)	
8	Nataliya Obmochaeva
10	Ekaterina Kosianenko	
11	Victoriia Chaplina	
14	Natalia Dianskaya
15	Tatiana Kosheleva	
16	Iuliia Morozova	
17	Natalia Malykh	
19	Anna Malova (L)	
20	Anastasia Shlyakhovaya

Individual awards
Most Valuable Player: 
Best Scorer: 
Best Spiker: 
Best Blocker: 
Best Server: 
Best Setter: 
Best Receiver: 
Best Libero: 
Fair Play Award:

References
 Confédération Européenne de Volleyball (CEV)

External links

CEV Website
 Results at todor66.com

Women's European Volleyball Championships
2013 Women's European Volleyball Championship
Women's European Volleyball Championship
2013 Women's European Volleyball Championship
2013 Women's European Volleyball Championship
2013 Women's European Volleyball Championship
2013 Women's European Volleyball Championship
2013 Women's European Volleyball Championship
Women's European Volleyball Championship
2013 Women's European Volleyball Championship
Women's European Volleyball Championship
Volley
Women's volleyball in Germany
Women's volleyball competitions in Switzerland
Women in Berlin